The Ziz River (  or  ) is a river in the south of Morocco and Algeria. It has its source in the High Atlas mountains of Morocco and flows  into the Sahara Desert in Algeria. Although water flow is intermittent along the Ziz riverbed, its watercourse has long been used to facilitate human transit through the mountainous region.

Cities along the Ziz river include Errachidia, Erfoud and Sijilmassa. There is a dam with hydroelectric generating capacity on the Ziz near Errachidia.

Water rights
Along the Ziz there is typically a common water rights rule, wherein each village and villager is entitled to a fair use and extraction of Ziz waters. Characteristically water is diverted in flatter areas to form a canal that irrigates palm groves and other crops as well as supplies domestic use.

See also
Sijilmasa, a historically important city founded on the banks of the Ziz river

References

Sources

Rivers of Morocco